Robert E. Edmundson (April 10, 1879 – August 30, 1931), was a professional baseball player who played outfielder in the Major Leagues from 1906 to 1908. He would play for the Washington Senators.

External links

1879 births
1931 deaths
Washington Senators (1901–1960) players
Major League Baseball outfielders
Baseball players from Kentucky
New Orleans Pelicans (baseball) players
Houston Buffaloes players
Houston Wanderers players
Galveston Sand Crabs players
Minneapolis Millers (baseball) players
Sioux City Packers players